Chalk-Öydö is a village in the Osh Region of Kyrgyzstan. It is part of the Özgön District. Its population was 1,445 in 2021.

References

Populated places in Osh Region